Bussa, also known as Boussa in older texts, was the capital of northern Borgu, in northern Nigeria. It was the farthest navigable point on the Niger River, just above the rapids. The town site is now covered by Lake Kainji, which was created in 1968 with the construction of the Lake Kainji dam. The town was re-located to what is now called New Bussa.

History
In 1806, British explorer Mungo Park drowned in Bussa while on his second expedition to trace the course of the Niger River. During 1894-1898 its possession was disputed by Great Britain and France. In 1897, Bussa became part of the British Niger Coast protectorate.

The French Occupation of Bussa and Borgu has been recorded in the book Campaigning on the upper Nile and Niger by Seymour Vandeleur (i.e. Cecil Foster Seymour), published in 1898. In 1915, an uprising took place in Bussa against the British policy of indirect rule.

Richard Lander (1804–1834) an explorer relates that after the death of Mungo Park the inhabitants of Bussa were attacked by a raging epidemic, which was regarded as a visitation from heaven. "Take care not to touch the whites lest you perish like the people..."

References

External links

Nigeria Travel - see Kainji National Park
 Reclus, Elisée, The Earth and Its Inhabitants ...: West Africa (D. Appleton and Company: 1892)

French West Africa
Populated places in Niger State